Perryville Historic District is a  historic district in Perryville, Kentucky which was listed on the National Register of Historic Places in 1973.

The district is roughly bounded by Sheridan Ave., Wood, Jefferson and 5th Streets.  It included 55 contributing buildings, two contributing structures and four contributing sites.

It includes Elmwood Inn, which is the former Elmwood Academy from 1891 to 1923, built c.1850, served as a hospital in the Battle of Perryville.

Notes

References

Historic districts on the National Register of Historic Places in Kentucky
National Register of Historic Places in Boyle County, Kentucky